Old Indianapolis City Hall, formerly known as the Indiana State Museum, is a historic city hall located at Indianapolis, Indiana.  It was built in 1909–1910, and is a four-story, Classical Revival style brick building sheathed in Indiana limestone. It measures 188 feet by 133 feet. 

It was listed on the National Register of Historic Places in 1974.

History
City Hall was opened in 1910 and was used for that purpose until 1962, when city offices moved to the City-County Building.   

The building housed the Indiana State Museum from 1966 to 2001.  Later, when the Indianapolis Public Library Central Library was rebuilt, the building was used as temporary Central Library.

Proposed reuse
Since the criminal and civil courts will be moving out of City-County Building (CCB) by 2022 into a new Jail/Courts complex, Mayor Joe Hogsett proposed in 2018 that the CCB be sold to private developers and the City/County government be moved back into an updated city hall.   "Our offices struggle to reorganize around modern technology," Hogsett said. "Many of our offices are sized with the assumption records will be kept in rows and rows of filing cabinets. Why not? That's how they kept the records in 1960. That's how the (City-County Building) was built."

References

External links
 

Historic American Buildings Survey in Indiana
City and town halls on the National Register of Historic Places in Indiana
Neoclassical architecture in Indiana
Government buildings completed in 1910
Buildings and structures in Indianapolis
National Register of Historic Places in Indianapolis